The théâtre Daunou is a Parisian theater with 450 seats, located at 7 rue Daunou in the 2nd arrondissement of Paris.

History 
The theatre was a command from the actress Jane Renouardt to the architect Auguste Bluysen. The building is in an Art déco style, while the inner decoration was the work of Armand Rateau.

In December 1971, a blaze destroyed the theatre; it reopened its doors in February 1973 with the play Aurélia by Robert Thomas.

Since its opening, the theatre has mainly presented comedies.

Programs 

 1921:  by André Birabeau and Pierre Wolff followed by the operetta  by Yves Mirande and Albert Willemetz, music Maurice Yvain, directed by Edmond Roze
 1923: Phili, moral tale in free verse and in five tableaux by Jacques Bousquet and  after Abel Hermant, directed by Edmond Roze, 30 December
 , operetta by Albert Willemetz, music Henri Christiné, 14 December
  by Claude Gevel, October
 1925: , comedy in one act by André Pascal, 14 January
 , comedy in three acts by Paul Gavault
 , operetta in three acts by Albert Willemetz and Saint-Granier, music by Henri Christiné, 14 March
 1926:  by Albert Cornu and Jean Mathieu, 2 January
  comedy in three acts by Paul Gavault, 13 February
 Alraune, play in three acts by René Florian after the novel by Hanns Heinz Ewers, 30 April
 , operetta bouffa in three acts by Fernand Nozière, 12 June
 , operetta by Jean Bastia after a short story by Mark Twain, music by Albert Chantrier, 12 September
  by Lucien Descaves, directed by Lugné-Poe, 19 October
 1927: , comedy in three acts and five tableaux by Valentine Jager-Schmidt and André Jager-Schmidt, 12 March
  by Pierre Scize and Andrée Méry after Jerome K. Jerome, directed by Edmond Roze,
 Lulu, operetta in three acts, libretto and lyrics Serge Véber, music by Philippe Parès and Georges van Parys, 14 September
 , operetta in three acts by Jean Alley, music Georges Auric, 24 April
 , comedy in three acts by Pierre Veber and Henry de Gorsse after Oreste Poggio, directed by Harry Baur, 18 May
 Arthur by André Barde, music Henri Christiné, 4 September
 1930:  by Paul Armont and Marcel Gerbidon, 27 February
  revue by Rip, April
  comedy in three acts by André Barde, music Maurice Yvain, 25 October
 Mistigri, comedy in four acts by Marcel Achard, directed by Jacques Baumer, 22 December
 1932: , operetta in three acts by Raoul Praxy, music Gaston Gabaroche, 28 January
 , operetta by Jean Bastia, music Pascal Bastia, 28 March
 1934: , operetta in three acts by Marc Cab, Paul Farge and Pierre Bayle, music Michel Emer and Georges Sellers, 7 December
 1935: , comedy in three acts by René Pujol, 11 May
 1937: , comedy in three acts by André Birabeau, 19 May
 1938:  by André Birabeau
 1938: , comedy in three acts by André Birabeau, 14 December
 1939:  by Yvette Mercier-Gouin, 5 May
 1941: L'Amant de Bornéo, comedy in three acts and four tableaux by Roger-Ferdinand and José Germain, 28 January
  by André Birabeau, directed by Robert Blome,
 1942:  by Jacques Deval, directed by Marcel Vergne,
 , comedy in three acts by André Birabeau,
  by André Birabeau, 12 November
 1943:  by Marc-Gilbert Sauvajon, 3 December
 1944: , tale in three acts by Michel Dulud
 1945:  by André de Wissant, music Pascal Bastia, with the composer
 Raffles by Ernest William Hornung, D. Nicodemi, directed by Jean Paqui, 8 November
 1946: L'Amant de paille by Marc-Gilbert Sauvajon, 2 February
 , comedy in five tableaux by Michelle Lahaye, directed by Robert Dhéry, June
 , comedy in three acts by Georges Beer and Louis Verneuil, October
 , comedy in three acts by Jacques Deval, December
 1947: , comedy in three acts by Pierre Rocher,
 Enlevez-moi, operetta by Raoul Praxy and Henry Hallais,
 1948:  by Roger Ferdinand, directed by Jacques Baumer, 19 March
 1949: Le Médecin malgré lui by Molière
  by Roger Ferdinand, directed by Jean Wall, 18 December
 1950: George et Margaret, comedy in three acts by Gerald Savory, adaptation by Marc-Gilbert Sauvajon and Jean Wall, directed by the latter,
 , comedy in three acts by Pierre Barillet and Jean-Pierre Gredy, directed by Jean Wall, 9 December
 1951: Phèdre, comedy with one voice by André Ransan, 31 May
  by Albert Dubeux, 16 June
  by Jacques Vilfrid and Jean Girault, 23 September
 , comedy in three acts by Pierre Barillet and Jean-Pierre Gredy, directed by Jean Wall, 9 February
 1953: , by the Branquignols, directed by Robert Dhéry, 16 June
 1954:  by Pierre Dac and Robert Rocca
 1956:  by Pierre Barillet and Jean-Pierre Gredy, directed by Jean Wall, 12 January
 Lady Windermere's Fan by Oscar Wilde, directed by Marcelle Tassencourt, 24 February
  by Emlyn Williams, directed by Jacques Valois, September
  by Michel André, 14 December
 1958: Candida by George Bernard Shaw, directed by Roland Piétri, March
   by Michel Fermaud, 12 December
 1960:  by Serge Veber, directed by Guy Lauzin, 27 April
   by Vasiliei Vasil'evitch Chkvarkin, directed by René Dupuy, 8 September
 1961:  by Jaime Silas, directed by Robert Manuel, 21 October
 1962: Mic-mac de Jean Meyer, directed by the author, 23 November
 1963:  by Arthur Watkyn, directed by Michel Fagadau, August
 1964: Chat en poche by Georges Feydeau, directed by Jean-Laurent Cochet, 1 October
 1965: Pepsie, comedy in three acts by Pierre-Edmond Victor, directed by Jean-Laurent Cochet, 16 November
 1970:  by Alan Ayckbourn, directed by Jean-Laurent Cochet, 18 September
 1973: Aurélia by Robert Thomas, directed by the author
  by Louis C. Thomas and Jacques Rémy, directed by Jacques Ardouin
 Virgule by Roger Hanin
 1977: The Portrait of Dorian Gray by Oscar Wilde, directed by Pierre Boutron
 1978:  by Robert Thomas, directed by the author
 1979:  by Nicole de Buron, directed by Michel Roux
 1980:  by Luigi Pirandello, directed by Henri Tisot
 1981:  by Jean-Jacques Bricaire and Maurice Lasaygues, directed by Robert Manuel, 24 January
 1981:  by André Roussin, directed by Michel Fagadau, 10 October
 1983:  by Roger Hanin and directed by the author
  by Trevor Cowper, adaptation by Pierre Florent and Dominique Florent
 1984: From Harlem to Broadway by Dany Francken and Victor Cuno
 1985:  by Michel Lengliney
 1986:  by Renée Taylor and Joseph Bologna, adaptation Marcel Mithois, directed by Michel Roux,
  by Alain Reynaud-Fourton, directed by Maurice Risch
 1988: Obsessions by Patrick Hamilton, directed by Raymond Gérôme
  by Jean-Claude Massoulier, directed by Marc Cassot
 1989: Le Nouveau Testament by Sacha Guitry, directed by Jean-Laurent Cochet
 Tu m'as sauvé la vie by Sacha Guitry, directed by Jean-Laurent Cochet
 1990:  after Michael Pertwee, adaptation Pierre Laville, directed by Michel Roux, 19 February
  by Arthur Watkin, directed by Michel Fagadau
 1993: Le Canard à l'orange by William Douglas Home, directed by Pierre Mondy and Alain Lionel, 17 July
 1994:  by Pierre Laville, directed by Jean-Claude Brialy, 15 January
 Le Canard à l'orange by William Douglas Home, directed by Pierre Mondy and Alain Lionel, 25 July
 1995: Un inspecteur vous demande by John Boynton Priestley, directed by Annick Blancheteau, 27 February
 Croque-monsieur by Marcel Mithois, directed by Raymond Acquaviva
 1996:  by Laurence Jyl, directed by Jean-Luc Moreau
 1997:  by Jacques Mougenot, directed by Jean-Laurent Cochet
 1998: Obsessions by Patrick Hamilton, directed by Raymond Gérôme, 21 January
  by Laurence Jyl, directed by Jean-Luc Moreau,
 2000: Sous les pavés, la plage by Rita Brantalou and Philippe Bruneau, mise en scène Jean-Luc Moreau, 23 September
 2001:  by Jean-Christophe Barc, directed by Benoît Lavigne, 29 June
 Frou-Frou les Bains by Patrick Haudecœur, directed by Jacques Décombe, 25 September
 2004:  by Jean-Christophe Barc and Alain Jeanbart, directed by Thierry Liagre, 22 January
  by Jacques Pessis, directed by Rubia Matignon, David Bréval, Glysleïn Lefever, 7 April
 Patate by Marcel Achard, directed by Bernard Menez, 28 July
 Caramba by Guy Montagné, Sylvie Raboutet, directed by Eric Mariotto, Guy Montagné, 25 September
 2005:  and Ray Cooney and John Chapman, directed by Éric Hénon, 11 January
  and Paul Fuks, Dan Greenburg, directed by Jean-Paul Bazziconi, 25 January
 Frou-Frou les Bains by Patrick Haudecœur, directed by Jacques Décombe, 8 July
 2006: The Decline of the American Empire by Denys Arcand, Claude-Michel Rome, directed by Claude-Michel Rome, 11 July
  by Catherine Le Cossec, Juli Noel, Marie-Thérèse Orain, 25 July
 2007: , 5 March
 2008:  by Jacques Pessis, directed by Rubia Matignon, 12 March
  by Didier Caron, directed by the author, 2 July
  by Françoise Chandernagor, directed by Jean-Claude Idée
 2009:  by Françoise Chandernagor, directed by Jean-Claude Idée, 25 February
  by Laurence Jyl, directed by Olivier Macé and Jean-Pierre Dravel, 21 July
  by Laure Charpentier, directed by Olivier Macé and Jean-Pierre Dravel, 3 November
 2009:  by Jean-Marie Chevret, directed by Olivier Macé and Jean-Pierre Dravel
 2010:  by Jean-Marie Chevret, directed by Olivier Macé and Jean-Pierre Dravel, 29 September
 Jacques Brel , directed by André Nerman, 8 April
 Fréhel,  by Pascale Lievyn, 20 May
 2011:  by Christian Dob, 25 January
  by Jean-Yves Rogale, directed by Philippe Hersen, 19 April
 L'Avare by Molière, directed by Colette Roumanoff, 9 May
  by Jean-Yves Rogale, directed by Philippe Hersen, 1 September

See also 
 List of theatres and entertainment venues in Paris

Daunou
Daunou